The Ministry of Railways is a ministry in the Government of India, responsible for the country's rail transport. The ministry operates the statutory body Indian Railways, an organisation that operates as a monopoly in rail transport and is headed by the Chairman and CEO of Railway Board. The Ministry of Railways along with the Railway Board is housed inside Rail Bhawan in New Delhi.

Organisational structure 
The ministry has a Union Minister and Minister of State. A number of directorates report to the Railway Board. Most of the officers posted in Ministry of Railways are either from organised "Group A Railway services" or the Railway Board Secretariat Service.

Indian Railways
The statutory body known as the Indian Railways, which reports to parliament and is under the ownership of Ministry of Railways of the Government of India. The Indian Railway Board comprises one Chairman, seven "members of the Railway Board", and a Financial Commissioner (who is the representative of the Ministry of Finance in the Railway Board). It also includes a Director-General (Railway Health Services), Director-General (personnel) and a Director-General (Railway Protection Force).

The name change of railway stations in India require approval by the Indian Railway Board.

Current members 
Current Minister of Railways:
 Ashwini Vaishnaw (2021-current)

Current Minister of State, Railways:
 Raosaheb Danve (2021-current)
 Darshana Jardosh (2021-current)

Present Members of Railway Board:
 Chairman and CEO of Railway Board : Anil Kumar Lahoti, IRSE
 Member Infrastructure: Roop Narayan Sunkar, IRSE
 Member (Traction and Rolling stock): Naveen Gulati, IRSEE
 Member (Operation and Business development): Jaya Varma Sinha, IRTS
 Member: Anjali Goyal, IRAS
 Finance Commissioner: Position abolished
Director General (RHS): Bishnu Prasad Nanda
 Director General (RPF): Arun Kumar, IPS
 Director General (HR) : Vacant
 Director General (Safety) : Rahul Jain (L/A)
 Secretary: Sushant Kumar Mishra

History 
In 1901, on the recommendations of Sir Thomas Robertson Committee regarding the administration and working of the railways, an early version of the railway board was constituted. It initially had three members.

In 1905, its powers were formalised by Lord Curzon's government. Its membership consisted of a Government Railway official, who was the chairman of the board, a railway manager from England and an agent of a Company Railway. The board was placed under the Department of Commerce and Industry of the Indian Government.

In 1921, a reorganisation of the Railway Board was carried out, and a Chief Commissioner of Railways was appointed, who was solely responsible to the Government for decisions on technical matters and for advising the Government on matters of policy. Pursuant to the Acworth Committee's recommendations in 1921, the Railway Board was reconstituted with effect from 1 April 1924. The reconstituted board consisted of the Chief Commissioner, a Financial Commissioner and two members. One was responsible for ways and works, and projects and stores. The other was responsible for general administration, staff and traffic.

In 1929, an additional post at the member level was added to the board. It was given responsibility for staff, so that the member in charge of traffic could focus solely on transport and commercial matters. During this time, Frank D'Souza became the first Indian member of the board.

In April, 1951 the post of Chief Commissioner was abolished and the senior-most functional member was appointed the chairman of the board, resulting in a membership of four.

In October 1954, the chairman of the board was made responsible for decisions on technical and policy matters, with the status of a Principal Secretary to Government in the Ministry of Railways. One more Member was also added and the strength of the Board again became five.

In 1988, a new member with responsibility for signals, telecommunication and electrical matters was added to the board. On 16 April 2019 two more members, one with responsibility for signals and telecommunications, and another for material management, joined the board. At this point, the Railway Board had a strength of eight—a Chairman, and seven members. The Chairman is assisted by officers of Railway Board Secretariat Service.

On 24 December 2019, the Union Cabinet decided to reduce the size of the board from eight to five. It also decided to merge its different cadres into a single Railway Management Service. The newly constituted Board will have Members for "Operation, Business Development, Human Resources, Infrastructure and Finance".

Railway Budget 

The East India Railway Committee, chaired by Sir William Acworth reported that there was a need for unified management of the entire railway system. On the recommendations of this committee and ratification of a resolution to do so in 1921, the government took over the actual management of all the railways, and also separated the railway finances from the general governmental finances. It also began to present the Railway Budget separately from the general budget of India every year. The Railway Board was expanded to have a Financial Commissioner, a member in charge of ways, works, stores and projects, and a member in charge of administration, staff, and traffic. Accordingly, from 1 April 1929, the responsibility for the compilation of accounts for the Railways was taken over by the Financial Commissioner, Railways from the Auditor General.

The last Railway Budget was presented on 25 February 2016 by Mr. Suresh Prabhu. The Modi government on 21 September 2016 approved merger of the rail and general budgets from 2017, ending a 92-year-old colonial era practice of a separate budget.

Controversies 
On 14 February 2008, Westinghouse Air Brake Technologies Corporation, listed on the New York Stock Exchange, admitted to violating Foreign Corrupt Practices Act (FCPA) regulations by making improper payments from its subsidiary Pioneer Friction Limited, based in Kolkata, to government officials of the Indian railway board. Payments were made in order to obtain and retain business with the Railway Board and curb taxes.

Mahesh Kumar was suspended, although the Railway Board clarified that no rules had been broken during the appointment of Mahesh Kumar.

References

External links 
 Official website of the Ministry of Railways
 IRFCA link of railways ministers

 
Railways
India, Railways
1853 establishments in India